The 1994 European Cup Winners' Cup Final was a football match on 4 May 1994 contested between Arsenal of England and Parma of Italy. It was the final match of the 1993–94 European Cup Winners' Cup and the 34th European Cup Winners' Cup final. The final was held at the Parken Stadium in Copenhagen, and Arsenal won 1–0 with the goal coming from Alan Smith. It is widely considered as the peak of Arsenal's famous defence. Arsenal became the fourth London club to win the trophy after Tottenham Hotspur, Chelsea and West Ham United.

Background
Having beaten Antwerp in the same competition in the previous year, Parma were aiming to become the first side to win consecutive finals; five sides had previously failed to do so after reaching the final for a consecutive year. The final was the first time that Parma had come up against English opposition. On the other hand, Arsenal had three times played out two-legged affairs with Italian clubs. The first meeting was in the 1970–71 Inter-Cities Fairs Cup, when they overcame Lazio 4–2 on aggregate, drawing the first leg in Rome and winning the second leg 2–0 at Highbury. Arsenal had also faced Italians in the 1979–80 European Cup Winners' Cup at the semi-final stage; Arsenal won 2–1 on aggregate. The most recent meeting was in the quarter-finals of this year's competition, where they overcame Torino 1–0 over two legs.

It was the first time Parken Stadium had hosted the major European competition's final and the first time any European competition's final had been held in Denmark. The stadium had opened only recently – in 1992 – and was the home of Copenhagen and the Danish national football team, taking two years to construct at the cost of 640 million Danish kroner. It was built on the site of the national team's previous home, Idrætsparken.

Route to the final

Match

Summary
A crowd of 33,765 witnessed a tactical match. Parma's Tomas Brolin hit the post early on but, in the 20th minute, Lorenzo Minotti miss-hit an overhead clearance and Alan Smith capitalized, beating Luca Bucci with a left-footed volley. Arsenal then invited pressure from Parma but, by controlling Gianfranco Zola and Faustino Asprilla, defended their lead and became the fourth London club to win the trophy. The final was noted for Arsenal fans singing "one nil to the Arsenal" throughout the match.

Arsenal were without their leading goalscorer Ian Wright, who missed the final through suspension as well as the injured John Jensen, Martin Keown, and David Hillier. Arsenal were fielding a starting midfield of Ian Selley, Steve Morrow and Paul Davis. The famous back five of Seaman, Dixon, Adams, Bould and Winterburn was safely in place but with Wright suspended, Alan Smith was given a lone role up front with Merson and Kevin Campbell instructed to play wide in a 4-5-1.

Details

See also
1993–94 European Cup Winners' Cup
1994 UEFA Champions League Final
1994 UEFA Cup Final
1994 European Super Cup
Arsenal F.C. in European football
Parma Calcio 1913 in European football

References

External links
1994 European Cup Winners' Cup Final at Rec.Sport.Soccer Statistics Foundation

3
Cup Winners' Cup Final 1994
Cup Winners' Cup Final 1994
UEFA Cup Winners' Cup Finals
Cup Winners' Cup Final
International club association football competitions hosted by Denmark
1990s in Copenhagen
May 1994 sports events in Europe
International sports competitions in Copenhagen